The 2006–07 Everton F.C. season was Everton's 15th season in the FA Premier League, and their 53rd consecutive season in the top division of English football.

Season summary
Everton finished in sixth place in the Premier League table – enough for participation in the 2007–08 UEFA Cup.

Final league table

First-team squad
Squad at end of season

Left club during season

Player awards 
 Player of the Season - Mikel Arteta
 Players' Player of the Season - Joleon Lescott
 Young Player of the Season - James Vaughan
 Reserve / U21 Player of the Season - John Irving
 Academy Player of the Season - Shaun Densmore
 Goal of the Season- James McFadden vs. Charlton Athletic

Statistics

Appearances

Results

Premier League

Results by round

Matches

League Cup

FA Cup

Transfers

In

Out

Loan in

Loan out

References

Everton F.C. seasons
Everton F.C.